This is a list of player transfers involving RFU Championship teams before or during the 2021–22 season. The list is of deals that are confirmed and are either from or to a rugby union team in the Championship during the 2020–21 season. It is not unknown for confirmed deals to be cancelled at a later date. On 20 June, Saracens were promoted to Premiership Rugby for the 2021–22 season after defeating Ealing Trailfinders in the promotion playoff. No team is relegated from the Premiership this season due to an increase in the number of teams in the Premiership for 2021–22. Due to the COVID-19 pandemic there was also no National League 1 in 2020–21, so no sides are relegated/promoted to or from the division.

Ampthill

Players In
 Henry Trinder from  Vannes
 Zac Nearchou from  Wasps (season-long loan)
 Theo Vukašinović from  Wasps (season-long loan)
 Tom Hudson from  Gloucester
 Ewan Fenley from  Ealing Trailfinders (season-long loan)
 Harry Seward from  Ealing Trailfinders (season-long loan)
 Harry Jarvis promoted from Academy
 Jack Dickinson from  Loughborough Students
 Billy Harding from  Graulhet
 Ben Cambriani from  Ospreys
 Cai Devine from  Wales Sevens
 Reece Dunn from  Gloucester (season-long loan)
 Joe Goodchild from  Dragons
 Paddy Ryan from  Cornish Pirates
 Josh Skelcey from  Plymouth Albion
 Joe-Luca Smith from  London Scottish
 Harri Morgan from  Ospreys (short-term loan)

Players Out 
 Syd Blackmore to  Cornish Pirates
 James Flynn to  Jersey Reds
 Alex Humfrey to  Jersey Reds
 Will Brown to  Jersey Reds
 Sam Hudson to  Doncaster Knights
 Jeremy To'a to  Plymouth Albion 
 Corey Lewis to  Cambridge
 Craig Duncan to  Richmond
 Kieran Frost to  Cambridge
 Louis Grimoldby to  Bedford Blues
 Suvwe Obano to  Nottingham
 Sam Baker to  London Scottish
 David Halaifonua to  London Scottish
 Matt Marsh to  Nottingham
 Henry Trinder to  Dallas Jackals

Bedford Blues

Players In
 Tui Uru from  Northampton Saints
 Josh Pieterse from  Ealing Trailfinders
 Bailey Ransom from  Newcastle Falcons
 Alex Woolford from  Coventry
 Will Biggs from  Birmingham Moseley
 Ollie Stedman from  Doncaster Knights
 Osman Dimen from  Leicester Tigers
 Joey Conway from  UL Bohemians
 Alex Day from  Saracens
 Luke Frost from  Nottingham
 Dean Adamson from  Rouen
 Jack Hughes from  Northampton Saints (short-term deal)
 Robin Williams from  RGC 1404
 Louis Grimoldby from  Ampthill
 Frank Kelly from  Luctonians
 Jake Garside from  Northampton Saints (short-term loan)
 Oisín Heffernan from  Northampton Saints (short-term loan)
 Emmanuel Iyogun from  Northampton Saints (short-term loan)
 Jamie Elliott from  Zebre Parma

Players Out
 Seán McCarthy retired
 Elijah Niko to  Aurillac 
 Oli Curry retired
 Henry Paul to  Doncaster Knights
 Joe Wrafter to  Doncaster Knights
 Joe Green to  Cambridge 
 Will Carrick-Smith to  Richmond
 James Lennon to  Richmond

Cornish Pirates

Players In
 Arwel Robson from  Dragons
 Ruaridh Dawson unattached
 Tom Kessell from  Bristol Bears 
 Joe Elderkin from  Exeter University
 Will Gibson from  Cardiff Metropolitan University
 Ed Scragg from  Dragons
 Carwyn Penny from  Dragons
 Syd Blackmore from  Ampthill
 Callum Sirker from  Wasps
 Bear Williams from  Rosslyn Park
 Caleb Montgomery from  Worcester Warriors (season-long loan)
 James Benjamin from  Dragons (short-term loan)
 Garyn Phillips from  Ospreys (short-term loan)

Players Out
 Dan Frost to  Wasps 
 Jean-Baptiste Bruzulier to  Hartpury University
 Rhodri Davies released
 Craig Mitchell retired
 Will Cargill to  Sandbach 
 Harry Davey to  Doncaster Knights
 Maliq Holden to  Doncaster Knights
 Fa'atiga Lemalu to  Manawatu
 Paddy Ryan to  Ampthill
 Tom Cowan-Dickie to  Leicester Tigers (short-term loan)

Coventry

Players In
 Josh Bainbridge from  Jersey Reds
 Joe Jones from  Doncaster Knights
 Jonathan Kpoku from  Saracens
 Sam Aspland-Robinson from  Leicester Tigers (season-long loan)
 Tom Griffiths from  Dragons (season-long loan)
 Joe Snow from  Exeter Chiefs
 Dan Richardson from  Leicester Tigers (short-term loan)
 Dan Babos from  Dragons (short-term loan)

Players Out 
 Ben Nutley retired
 Alex Woolford to  Bedford Blues
 Alex Gibson to  London Scottish
 Sam McNulty to  Birmingham Moseley
 Keston Lines to  Chinnor 
 Kalius Hutchinson to  Birmingham Moseley 
 Henry Clement to  Plymouth Albion
 Andrew Bulumakau to  Birmingham Moseley

Doncaster Knights

Players In 
 Guido Volpi from  Ospreys
 Connor Edwards from  Dragons
 Alex Dolly from  Nottingham
 Harry Davey from  Cornish Pirates
 Maliq Holden from  Cornish Pirates
 Henry Paul from  Bedford Blues
 Joe Wrafter from  Bedford Blues
 George Oram from  Richmond
 Josh Peters from  Dijon
 Joe Margetts from  Ayrshire Bulls
 Fraser Strachan from  Ealing Trailfinders
 Joe Green from  Leeds Tykes
 Sam Hudson from  Ampthill
 Danny Drake from  Scarlets
 Ronan McCusker from  New England Free Jacks
 George Edgson from  Jersey Reds
 Ben Murphy from  Cardiff
 Thom Smith from  Leicester Tigers

Players Out
 Robin Hislop to  Wasps
 Jerry Sexton to  Bourgoin-Jallieu
 James Mitchell to  Jersey Reds
 Joe Jones to  Coventry
 Will Britton to  Gloucester
 Ollie Stedman to  Bedford Blues
 Matt Challinor to  Rotherham Titans
 Charlie Foley to  Hartpury University
 Ben Hunter released
 Conor Joyce released
 Sam Pocklington to  Rotherham Titans
 Matt Smith to  Rotherham Titans
 Harry Strong released
 James Newey to  Blackheath 
 Howard Packman to  Blackheath
 James Kane to  Richmond

Ealing Trailfinders

Players In
 Reuben Bird-Tulloch from  Northampton Saints
 Cian Kelleher from  Leinster 
 Gary Porter from  Ikey Tigers
 Jack Digby from  Eastern Suburbs
 Stephen Kerins from  Connacht
 James Little from  North Harbour
 Jimmy Roots from  North Harbour
 Bill Johnston from  Ulster
 Tadgh McElroy from  Bristol Bears 
 Jan-Henning Campher from  Lions
 Len Massyn from  Lions
 Dylan Smith from  Stade Français
 Jared Rees from  Paarl Boys' High School

Players Out
 Elliot Millar-Mills to  Wasps 
 Johannes Jonker to  Bath
 Kieran Murphy retired
 Guy Thompson to  Jersey Reds
 Nathan Fowles released
 Josh Pieterse to  Bedford Blues
 Robert Beattie to  Ayrshire Bulls
 Abongile Nonkontwana to  Bourgoin-Jallieu
 Fraser Strachan to  Doncaster Knights
 Dean Hammond to  Chinnor 
 Jack Tovey to  Hartpury University
 Oli Robinson to  Hartpury University
 Ben West to  London Welsh
 Jack Rouse to  Richmond
 Ewan Fenley to  Ampthill (season-long loan)
 Harry Seward to  Ampthill (season-long loan)
 Levi Davis to  Birmingham Moseley 
 Michael van Vuuren to  Chinnor
 Tadgh McElroy to  London Irish (season-long loan)
 Arun Watkins to  Richmond
 Dylan Smith to  Bulls

Hartpury University

Players In
 Jean-Baptiste Bruzulier from  Cornish Pirates
 Tommy Mathews from  Northampton Saints
 Conor Maguire from  Gloucester
 Xavier Hastings from  Bath
 Jack Tovey from  Ealing Trailfinders
 Charlie Foley from  Doncaster Knights
 Oli Robinson from  Ealing Trailfinders
 Harry Short promoted from Academy
 Ollie Adkins from  Gloucester (season-long loan)
 Josh Gray from  Gloucester (season-long loan)
 Joe Howard from  Gloucester (season-long loan)
 Ethan Hunt from  Gloucester (season-long loan)
 Matty Jones from  Gloucester (season-long loan)
 Cameron Jordan from  Gloucester (season-long loan)
 Toby Venner from  Gloucester (season-long loan)
 Peter McCabe from  Bristol Bears

Players Out
 Seb Nagle-Taylor to  Gloucester
 Ervin Muric to  Suresnes
 Jack Johnson to  Worcester Warriors
 Nick Selway to  London Scottish
 Max Clementson to  Chinnor 
 Will Safe to  Birmingham Moseley 
 Ehize Ehizode to  London Scottish 
 Angus Southon to  London Scottish
 Cam Roberts to  Esher
 Tommy Mathews to  Wasps (short-term deal)
 Ashley Challenger to  Bristol Bears
 Toby Venner to  Bristol Bears (short-term loan)

Jersey Reds

Players In
 Scott van Breda from  Worcester Warriors
 Guy Thompson from  Ealing Trailfinders
 James Flynn from  Ampthill
 Alex Humfrey from  Ampthill
 Wesley White unattached
 Will Brown from  Ampthill
 Jordan Holgate from  Slava Moscow
 Will Lane from  Loughborough Students
 James Mitchell from  Doncaster Knights
 Ryan Olowofela from  Northampton Saints
 Harry Simmons from  Leicester Tigers (season-long loan)
 Huw Owen from  Pontypridd
 Max Ayling from  Dragons
 Steven Longwell from  Old Glory DC
 Luke Yendle from  Dragons (short-term loan)
 Tom Pittman from  Boroughmuir Bears
 Ioan Davies from  Dragons (short-term loan)
 Alun Lawrence from  Cardiff (season-long loan)

Players Out
 Lesley Klim released
 Apakuki Ma'afu retired
 George Spencer released
 Tom Williams retired
 Dan Richardson to  Leicester Tigers
 Josh Bainbridge to  Coventry
 Ziana Alexis to  Cambridge 
 Rory Bartle to  Cardiff 
 Ollie Dawe to  Rosslyn Park 
 George Edgson to  Doncaster Knights
 Ciaran Parker to  London Irish

London Scottish

Players In 
 Rory Hughes unattached
 Alex Gibson from  Coventry
 Maurice Nwakor from  Rosslyn Park
 Tom Petty unattached
 Will Routledge from  Leeds Beckett University
 Nick Selway from  Hartpury University
 Mark Cooke from  Blackheath
 Laurence May from  Chinnor
 Dan Nutton from  Edinburgh
 Tom Baldwin from  Blackheath
 Edoardo Bolacco from  Old Elthamians
 Morgan Dawes from  Birmingham Moseley
 Ehize Ehizode from  Hartpury University
 Cameron King from  Cardiff Metropolitan University
 Angus Southon from  Hartpury University
 James Tyas from  Chinnor
 Sam Baker from  Ampthill 
 Ben Charnock from  University of Warwick 
 Josh Drauniniu from  Albi 
 Leo Fielding from  Blackheath
 David Halaifonua from  Ampthill
 Aaron Purewal from  Richmond

Players Out
 Ollie Adams released
 Jordan Brodley released
 Phil Cringle released
 Ryan Eveleigh released
 Jason Worrall to  Chinnor 
 Nodar Tcheishvili to  The Black Lion
 Sam Yawayawa to  Chinnor 
 Fred Tuilagi to  Chinnor 
 Toby Freeman to  Tonbridge Juddians 
 Luke Carter to  Chinnor
 Jacob Perry released
 Ryan Crowley to  Chinnor
 Harry Morley to  Cambridge 
 Shek Sheriff to  Plymouth Albion
 Mark Bright to  Richmond
 Miles Wakeling to  Richmond
 Matthew Davies released
 Matt Eliet released
 Joe-Luca Smith to  Ampthill

Nottingham

Players In
 Storm Hanekom from  Dragons
 Suvwe Obano from  Ampthill
 Joe Browning from  Leicester Tigers (season-long loan)
 Lewis Chessum from  Leicester Tigers (season-long loan)
 Jacob Cusick from  Leicester Tigers (season-long loan)
 Sam Edwards from  Leicester Tigers (season-long loan)
 Tim Hoyt from  Leicester Tigers (season-long loan)
 Archie Vanes from  Leicester Tigers (season-long loan)
 Elliot Creed from  Birmingham Moseley
 Elliot Bale from  Châteaurenard
 Morgan Bunting from  Rotherham Titans
 Matt Marsh from  Ampthill

Players Out
 Alex Dolly to  Doncaster Knights
 Luke Frost to  Bedford Blues
 Willie Ryan to  Chinnor 
 Tom Benjamin to  Birmingham Moseley 
 Ben Brownlie to  Cambridge 
 Alex Crocker to  Richmond

Richmond

Players In
 Ethan Benson from  Saracens
 Mark Bright from  London Scottish
 Alex Burrage from  University of Bath
 Jared Cardew from  University of Exeter
 Will Carrick-Smith from  Bedford Blues
 Alex Crocker from  Nottingham
 Craig Duncan from  Ampthill
 Tom Ffitch from  Loughborough Students
 Cameron Gray from  Chinnor
 James Hadfield from  University of Bath
 Will Homer from  Scarlets
 Owain James from  Wasps
 James Lennon from  Bedford Blues
 Zuriel Makele from  University of Nottingham
 Edward Morgan from  Nottingham Trent University
 Ntinga Mpiko from  Lansdowne
 Jack Rouse from  Ealing Trailfinders
 Miles Wakeling from  London Scottish
 James Kane from  Doncaster Knights
 Arun Watkins from  Ealing Trailfinders

Players Out
 Alex Bibic retired
 Rob Kirby retired
 Jesse Liston retired
 Tom Pashley retired
 George Oram to  Doncaster Knights
 Aaron Purewal to  London Scottish

See also
List of 2021–22 Premiership Rugby transfers
List of 2021–22 United Rugby Championship transfers
List of 2021–22 Super Rugby transfers
List of 2021–22 Top 14 transfers
List of 2021–22 Rugby Pro D2 transfers
List of 2021–22 Major League Rugby transfers

References

2021-22
2021–22 RFU Championship